Leo John Mogus (April 13, 1921 – May 31, 1971) was an American professional basketball player.

A 6'4" forward/center, Mogus played at Youngstown State University from 1939 to 1943, where he scored 1,400 points. Mogus also played football at the school. After college, he played professional basketball in the Basketball Association of America (later National Basketball Association) as a member of the Cleveland Rebels, Toronto Huskies, Baltimore Bullets, Fort Wayne Pistons, Indianapolis Jets, and Philadelphia Warriors. He averaged 8.5 points per game in his BAA/NBA career, and during the 1946–47 BAA season, he ranked ninth in the league in total points (753), ninth in points per game (13.0), seventh in total assists (84), and ninth in assists per game (1.4).

To date, Mogus is the only player from Youngstown State University to play in the NBA. He was inducted into the school's Hall of Fame in 1985.

BAA/NBA career statistics

Regular season

Playoffs

References

External links

1921 births
1975 deaths
American expatriate basketball people in Canada
American men's basketball players
Baltimore Bullets (1944–1954) players
Basketball players from Ohio
Centers (basketball)
Cleveland Rebels players
Fort Wayne Pistons players
Forwards (basketball)
Indianapolis Jets players
Philadelphia Warriors players
Toronto Huskies players
Youngstown Bears players
Youngstown State Penguins football players
Youngstown State Penguins men's basketball players